Edelmira Barreira Diz is a Spanish politician born in 1978 in Verín. She has served as the 1st Government Commissioner for the Demographic Challenge from 2017 to 2018 and previously as Senator for the Province of Ourense from 2015 to 2017.

Biography  
Edelmira Barreira was born in 1978 in Verín. She obtained a license in Political Science and Administration at the University of Santiago de Compostela.

In late 2015, she was elected senator for the Province of Ourense and re-elected in the 2016 general election. Barreira left her position as senator in January 2017 when the Spanish government led by PM Mariano Rajoy appointed her as Government Commissioner for the Demographic Challenge to boost the nation's declining population. Barreira left the office in June 2018 and was replaced by Isaura Leal Fernández.

See also
  Ana Belén Vázquez Blanco
  María Nava Castro Domínguez

References

1978 births
21st-century Spanish politicians
Politicians from Galicia (Spain)
Leaders of political parties in Spain
Living people
Members of the Senate of Spain
People's Party (Spain) politicians